Yahyaabad (also Romanized as Yaḩyáābād; also known as Yahiābād and Yakhiabad) is a village in Bonab Rural District, in the Central District of Zanjan County, Zanjan Province, Iran. At the 2006 census, its population was 64, in 15 families.

References 

Populated places in Zanjan County